Lizhuang is a town in Dangshan County, Suzhou, Anhui Province, China. As of the 2010 Chinese Census, Lizhuang has a population of 45,817.

The town has a humid subtropical climate. Many in Lizhuang are farmers, growing corn, pomegranates, and various vegetables. There is also a small coal mine in the town. Many of Lizhuang's adults have migrated elsewhere for work, leaving a large number of left-behind children to be raised by their grandparents.

Traditional houses in the town are made from stone held together with a paste made from ashes. Remittances from migrant workers have enabled some residents to construct homes with modern building materials such as bricks, roofing tile and cement.

Administrative divisions 
Lizhuang administers three residential communities and five administrative villages.

Residential communities 
Lizhuang administers the following three residential communities:

 Zhenxing Community
 Zhudian Community
 Bianlou Community

Administrative villages 
Lizhuang administers the following five administrative villages:

 Haisheng Xincun Village
 Liyuan Xincun Village
 Wangge Village
 Zhendong Village
 Jialou Village

Demographics 
According to the 2010 Chinese Census, Lizhuang has a population of 45,817, down from the 49,845 recorded in the 2000 Chinese Census.

In 2010, a Los Angeles Times reporter wrote a story on Lizhuang, using it as a microcosm for the growing phenomenon of left-behind children in China. In the story, the reporter found few able-bodied adults in the town, as many left to find more lucrative work elsewhere. Much of Lizhuang's elderly population was left taking care of their children.

Economy 
Many people in Lizhuang are subsistence farmers, and common crops in the town include corn, pomegranates, and various vegetables.

The town also has a coal mine, although it is not as large as those found in surrounding towns.

References 

Dangshan County

Towns in Anhui